Mansiche or San Salvador de Mansiche is a locality located in Trujillo city in northern Peru. This is an old town since colonial era.

History
Located in the northwest of Trujillo District was the outsides of the colonial city of Trujillo. In this town is located an old colonial church called Iglesia de Mansiche or Iglesia de San Salvador de Mansiche.  In the lands near this old town now are located several urban sectors as Jorge Chavez, Santa Isabel, Mansiche, etc. and also there is located the biggest sport complex in the city called Sports complex Mansiche.

Interesting places
Sports complex Mansiche
Iglesia de Mansiche

See also

Trujillo
Historic Centre of Trujillo
Chan Chan
Puerto Chicama
Chimu
Pacasmayo beach
Marcahuamachuco
Wiracochapampa
Moche
Víctor Larco Herrera District
 Vista Alegre
Huanchaco
Las Delicias beach
La Libertad Region
Trujillo Province, Peru
Virú culture
Lake Conache
Marinera Festival
Trujillo Spring Festival
Wetlands of Huanchaco
Salaverry
Salaverry beach
Puerto Morín

External links

 Map of Buenos Aires
 "Huaca de la luna and Huaca del sol"
 "Huacas del Sol y de la Luna Archaeological Complex", Official Website
 Information on El Brujo Archaeological Complex
 Chan Chan World Heritage Site, UNESCO
 Chan Chan conservation project
 Website about Trujillo, Reviews, Events, Business Directory

Multimedia
 
 
 
 Gallery pictures by Panoramio, Includes Geographical information by various authors
Colonial Trujillo photos

References

Localities of Trujillo, Peru